Megachile difficilis is a species of bee in the family Megachilidae.

References

Difficilis
Insects described in 1875